The Declaration of Helsinki from the Global Cities Dialogue is the set of principles and commitments that define the purpose of the organisation - an international grouping of over 100 cities whose representatives: 
"...believe that the development of the Information Society should be for the benefit of all their citizens, communities, and peoples of the world, regardless of race, social position, creed, gender or age...."

See also
 Digital divide
 World Summit on the Information Society
 Digital rights

References

Digital divide
Information and communication technologies for development
Rights